Dwayne Jones may refer to:
 Dwayne Jones (basketball), American basketball player
 Dwayne Jones (murder victim), Jamaican victim of hate crime

See also
Duane Jones (disambiguation)